Madremyia saundersii is a species of bristle fly in the family Tachinidae.

Distribution
Canada, United States, Mexico.

References

Exoristinae
Taxa named by Samuel Wendell Williston
Insects described in 1889
Diptera of North America